Rowland Hussey Macy Sr. (August 30, 1822 – March 29, 1877) was an American businessman who founded the department store chain Macy's.

Life and career
Macy was the fourth of six children born to a Quaker family on Nantucket Island, Massachusetts. At the age of fifteen, he worked on the whaleship Emily Morgan and had a red star tattooed on either his hand or his forearm (various versions as to the exact location of the marking have been reported). He married Louisa Houghton (1820–1888) in 1844, and had three children: Charles A. Macy (1845–1846); Rowland Hussey Macy Jr. (1847–1878); and Florence Macy (1853–1933), who married James F. Sutton.

He and his brother, Charles, opened a dry goods store in Marysville, California shortly after the city was founded at the height of the Gold Rush in 1850. Charles stayed in Marysville after the store failed, but Rowland headed east. Between 1843 and 1855, Macy opened four retail dry goods stores, including the original Macy's store in downtown Haverhill, Massachusetts, established in 1851 to serve the mill industry employees of the area. They all failed, but he learned from his mistakes. Macy moved to New York City in 1858 and established a new store named "R.H Macy Dry Goods" at Sixth Avenue on the corner of 14th Street, significantly north of other dry goods stores of the time. On the company's first day of business on October 28, 1858 sales totaled $11.08, equal to $ today.

As the business grew, Macy's expanded into neighboring buildings, opening up more and more departments, and used publicity devices such as a store Santa Claus, themed exhibits, and illuminated window displays to draw in customers.  It offered a money back guarantee, although it only accepted cash into the 1950s. The store also produced its own made-to-measure clothing for both men and women, assembled in an on-site factory.

In 1875, Macy took on two partners, Robert M. Valentine (1850–1879), a nephew; and Abiel T. La Forge (1842–1878) of Wisconsin, who was the husband of a cousin.

Macy died on March 29, 1877 in Paris of Bright's disease. He was interred in the Woodlawn Cemetery in The Bronx. His will was probated on May 1, 1877, and he left his wife, Louisa H. "absolutely, all the paraphernalia, wearing apparel, watches, rings, trinkets, jewels, and personal ornaments reputed to belong to her, and during her life, the use of all the household furniture, books, clocks, bronzes, and works of art." At her death this was to pass to his daughter, Florence. He left only a small annuity for his son. The following year, in 1878, Macy's partner La Forge died, and the third partner, Valentine, died in 1879.  Ownership of the store passed to the Macy family until 1895, when it was sold to Isidor and Nathan Straus.

In popular culture
A fictional, reimagined "R. H. Macy" (depicted as alive and running the company seventy years after the historical Macy's death) was portrayed in the 1947 movie Miracle on 34th Street by character actor Harry Antrim.  In subsequent adaptations of the story, the character was played by Don Beddoe in an episode of The 20th Century-Fox Hour in 1955, Hiram Sherman in a 1959 TV movie, and David Doyle in a 1973 TV film.

See also
R.H. Macy and Company Store (building) for the history of the flagship store on Herald Square in Manhattan
Macy's for a history of the chain
Macy's, Inc. for a history of Federated Department Stores, owners of Macy's

References
Notes

Further reading
 
Hungerford, Edward "Early History of Macy's" in The Romance of a Great Store (1922)

External links

1822 births
1877 deaths
American businesspeople in retailing
Burials at Woodlawn Cemetery (Bronx, New York)
Macy's
People from Nantucket, Massachusetts
Retail company founders
American people in whaling
19th-century American businesspeople
American Quakers